Henry Farrington may refer to:

Henry Farrington (MP)
Sir Henry Maturin Farrington, 3rd Baronet (1778–1834), of the Farington baronets
Sir Henry Anthony Farrington, 4th Baronet (1811–1888) of the Farington baronets
Sir Henry Anthony Farrington, 6th Baronet (1871–1944) of the Farington baronets
Sir Henry Francis Colden Farrington, 7th Baronet (1914–2004) of the Farington baronets
Sir Henry William Farrington, 8th Baronet (born 1951) of the Farington baronets